Heartless (also known as Lethal Seduction) is a 2005 film written by Howard Swindle and Adam Greenman, directed by Robert Markowitz. The film's running time is 90 minutes.

Plot
Miranda Wells is an attorney with a sideline in immigration fraud and murder. Miranda's assistant, Carla, is unaware of her criminal activities. David Lopez, a journalist setting out to expose Miranda, poses as Rick Benes, an illegal immigrant, and takes a job in the office.  Carla stumbles on incriminating files and David Lopez, in pursuit of the story, is threatened when he becomes infatuated with Miranda.  Carla is attacked and her husband murdered, Miranda is the chief suspect. As the investigation progresses and Carla disappears from hospital, it is clear that Miranda will stop at nothing including murdering again to stay out.

Cast

External links

2005 television films
2005 films
2005 drama films
Films directed by Robert Markowitz
American drama television films
2000s English-language films
2000s American films